Czech Republic competed at the 2013 Summer Universiade in Kazan, Russia from 6 July to 17 July 2013. 162 athletes are a part of the Czech team.

Czech Republic has won 16 medals, including 3 gold medals.

References

Nations at the 2013 Summer Universiade
Czech Republic at the Summer Universiade